John William Casilear (June 25, 1811 – August 17, 1893) was an American landscape artist belonging to the Hudson River School.

Casilear was born in New York City. His first professional training was under prominent New York engraver Peter Maverick in the 1820s, then with Asher Durand, himself an engraver at the time. Casilear and Durand became friends, and both worked as engravers in New York through the 1830s.

By the middle 1830s Durand had become interested in landscape painting through his friendship with Thomas Cole. Durand, in turn, drew Casilear's attention to painting. By 1840, Casilear's interest in art was sufficiently strong to accompany Durand, John Frederick Kensett, and artist Thomas Prichard Rossiter on a European trip during which they sketched scenes, visited art museums, and fostered their interest in painting.

Casilear gradually developed his talent in landscape art, painting in the style that was later to become known as the Hudson River School. By the middle 1850s he had entirely ceased his engraving career in favor of painting full-time. He was elected a full member of the National Academy of Design in 1851, having been an associate member since 1833, and exhibited his works there for over fifty years.

In 1867 Casilear married Helen M. Howard in the town of Tamworth, New Hampshire. She bore him an only son, John William Casilear Jr. (1867-1939). Casilear died in Saratoga Springs, New York in 1893. Today examples of his art are in the collections of the Metropolitan Museum of Art, New York, the National Gallery of Art, Washington DC, and Ringwood Manor, Ringwood, NJ. And the Woodmere Art Museum, Philadelphia, PA.

External links

American paradise: the world of the Hudson River school, an exhibition catalog from The Metropolitan Museum of Art (fully available online as PDF), which contains material on Casilear (see index)

1811 births
1893 deaths
American landscape painters
19th-century American painters
American male painters
Hudson River School painters
19th-century American male artists